Deaf Sentence (2008) is a novel by British author David Lodge.

References 

Novels by David Lodge
2008 British novels
Harvill Secker books